The Rolls-Royce company used an internal list of personnel shortcodes to identify its senior engineers and designers. These were usually based on a shortened form of the surname, later the initials. Such codes appeared on technical drawings and internal memos. The identities behind these codes represent an important part of the company history, especially during the period of intense development immediately before and during World War II.

References

Sources 
 
 
 
 
 
 
 
 
 
 

 Codes, Personnel
British mechanical engineers